Neon Horse is the debut album by the band Neon Horse. It was released on Tooth & Nail Records.

Track listing 
 "Cuckoo!" – 2:25
 "Speed Killz" – 2:21
 "I Know—I Just Don't Care" – 2:25
 "Crazy Daisy" – 2:37
 "Kick Yer Askin' for It" – 2:36
 "Go. Stop." – 2:08
 "The Bathroom Wall" – 1:43
 "Nice for You" – 1:44
 "Little Lamb" – 3:15
 "Pretty Face Divided" – 2:32
 "Horsey" – 2:24
 "Merciless Mother" – 4:12

References 

Tooth & Nail Records albums
2007 albums